is a Japanese metalworking procedure which produces a mixed-metal laminate with distinctive layered patterns; the term is also used to refer to the resulting laminate itself. The term  translates closely to "wood grain metal" or "wood eye metal" and describes the way metal takes on the appearance of natural wood grain.  fuses several layers of differently coloured precious metals together to form a sandwich of alloys called a "billet." The billet is then manipulated in such a way that a pattern resembling wood grain emerges over its surface. Numerous ways of working  create diverse patterns. Once the metal has been rolled into a sheet or bar, several techniques are used to produce a range of effects.

 has been used to create many artistic objects. Though the technique was first developed for production of decorative sword fittings, the craft is today mostly used in the production of jewelry and hollowware.

History

Origins
First developed in 17th-century Japan,  was originally used for swords. As the customary Japanese sword stopped serving as a weapon and became largely a status symbol, a demand arose for elaborate decorative handles and sheaths.

To meet this demand, Denbei Shoami (1651–1728), a master metalworker from Akita prefecture, invented the  process. He initially called his product , as the technique in its simplest form resembled , a type of carved lacquerwork with alternating layers of red and black.

This was useful in the traditional techniques of fusing and soldering the layers together.

Over time, the practice of  faded. The katana industry dried up in the late 19th century, with the Meiji Restoration returning ruling power to the emperor, following the dissolution of the shogunate government and the end of the samurai class. The public display of swords as a sign of samurai status was outlawed. After this, the few metalsmiths who practiced  along with most other sword related artisans largely transferred their skills to create other objects.

Tiffany's display again won the grand prize for silver wares, and the company continued to produce its Japanesque silver with  techniques up into the 20th century.

20th-21st century development
By the mid 20th century,  had fallen into heavy obscurity. Japan's movement away from traditional craftwork, paired with the great difficulty of mastering , had brought  artisans to the brink of extinction. It reached a point where only scholars and collectors of metalwork were aware of the technique. It was not until the 1970s, when Hiroko Sato Pijanowski – who learned the craft from Norio Tamagawa – that the craft was reignited in the public eye, as Hiroko and her husband Eugene Pijanowski brought the craft of  back to the United States and began teaching it to their students.

Present day
Today, jewelry, flatware, hollowware, spinning tops and other artistic objects are made using .

Modern processes are highly controlled and include a compressive force on the billet. This has allowed the technique to include many nontraditional components such as titanium, platinum, iron, bronze, brass, nickel silver, and various colors of karat gold including yellow, white, sage, and rose hues as well as sterling silver. At the Santa Fe Symposium, a major annual gathering of jewelers from around the world, there have been several papers presented on new, more predictable, and more economic, methods of producing  materials, along with new possibilities for laminating metals such as the use of friction-stir welding.

Techniques

Liquid phase fusion (historic)
In liquid phase fusion, metal sheets were stacked and carefully heated; the solid billet of simple stripes could be forged and carved to increase the pattern's complexity. Successful lamination using this process requires a highly skilled smith with a great deal of experience. Bonding in the traditional process is achieved when some or all of the alloys in the stack are heated to the point of becoming partially molten (above solidus) this liquid alloy is what fuses the layers together. Careful heat control and skillful forging are required for this process.

Soldering (brazing)
In attempting to recreate the appearance of traditional , some artisans tried brazing layers together. The sheets were soldered using silver solder or some other brazing alloy. This technique joined the metals, but is difficult to perfect, particularly on larger sheets. Flux inclusions could be trapped or bubbles could form. Commonly, imperfections need to be cut out, and the metal re-soldered. Ultimately the brazed sheets do not display the ductility and work-ability of diffusion bonded material.

Solid-state bonding (contemporary)
The modernized process of solid-state bonding typically uses a controlled atmosphere in a temperature-controlled furnace. Mechanical aids such as a hydraulic press or torque plates (bolted clamps) are also typically used to apply compressive force on the billet during lamination. These provide for the implementation of lower temperature solid-state diffusion between the interleaved layers, thus allowing the inclusion of non-traditional materials.

Development of the  pattern 
After the fusion of layers, the surface of the billet is cut with chisel to expose lower layers, then flattened. This cutting and flattening process will be repeated over and over again to develop intricate patterns.

Coloring
To increase the contrast between the laminate layers, many  items are colored by the application of a patina (a controlled corrosion layer) to accentuate or even totally change the colors of the metal's surface.

patination and 
The piece to be patinated is prepared, then immersed in a boiling solution until it reaches the desired color, and each element of a compound piece may be transformed to a different color. Historically, a paste of ground daikon radish was also used to prepare the work for the patina.

Similar laminates
In an accidental but parallel development, Sheffield plate was developed in England. It follows a similar principal of bonded layers, without use of solder, but typically had 2–3 layers, whereas  could have many more.

See also

References

External links 

 "Can you make copper & nickel Damascus?!? Mokume-gane," You Tube video showing the attempt of making a combined metal of copper and nickel, https://www.youtube.com/watch?v=8XgDHIx9LvQ (April 18, 2018), Retrieved December 15, 2018

Composite materials
Alloys
Metalworking
Artworks in metal